Besta may refer to:

 BESTA (e-learning), a brand of Inventec Besta for electronic dictionaries
 Inventec Besta, a subsidiary of Inventec
 Aleš Besta, Czech footballer
 Pavel Besta, Czech footballer
 Petra Besta (born 1967), Czech-born Australian handball player

See also 
 Bestall